The third season of Golpe de Sorte (Lucky Break) began airing on SIC on 15 September 2019 and ended on 10 November 2019. The season three of the series stars Maria João Abreu, Dânia Neto, Jorge Corrula and Diana Chaves.

Plot 
Persecution in Alvorinha! When the truth is finally revealed and police sirens are heard, Miriam (Dânia Neto) takes advantage of everyone's distraction and sets off. Bruno (Ângelo Rodrigues) warns the agents that the villain has fled by car but is it still time to stop Silvia?

Heaven's head doesn't stop with so much important information all at once. The euro-millionaire must warn the police that Miriam has taken her 10 million euros while concealing that agents tell her that Caio (Jorge Corrula) is innocent. When Heaven confronts Madre Rosário (Ana Bustorff) about the truth, she admits to the Euro-millionaire that Caio is indeed her son but that she intends to take him to Lisbon. However, Maria do Céu Garcia's (Maria João Abreu) idea is quite different...

Different is what happens in the house of Nobrega. Suddenly, it is Carlos who is the most. With Claudio (Duarte Gomes) injured, Teresa (Oceana Basilio) is taking care of Horace's son and expels the Director of the Health Center from his own home. Did this submission story finally come to an end?

With the end of the scammers, the Garcia remember all the blows of Silvia and Caio, dumbfounded. As they connect all the dots and realize the wickedness of the villains' actions, the whole family begins to hate Caio and Silvia... except Heaven, who seems to want to forgive her son...

Padre Aníbal (Diogo Amaral) seems to want to find an explanation for certain behaviors of Cíntia (Inês Monteiro) and seeks with Kelly (Adriane Garcia) the revelation of some secrets of Amália's (Rosa do Canto) cousin but the Brazilian is not. shows much available to unravel confessions. Will the priest ever know the whole story of the suffering Cintia?

Suffered is Caio with Madre Rosário. When she looks for him in the pension room, Heaven's son does not accept that throughout these years Rosario has not told him what he knew about his origin. Lost, Caio expels Madre Rosário and turns to drink...

Alice (Diana Chaves) can take it no longer and turns to Teresa, telling her everything she has been thinking over the last months: that Carlos is sick and has to be treated but also has to be stopped for his unacceptable behavior. The still wife of the Health Center Director agrees but asks them to give her some breathing room...

Heaven is also looking to breathe when she meets her friend "more than blood" Amália and tells her everything that happened and the discovery that Gaius is his son. After this very intimate conversation, the Euro-millionaire tells her son that she is willing to forgive him if he forgives her. But even more surprising is when Maria do Céu makes an announcement to the Garcia family that will leave everyone with their mouths open...

Cast

Main Cast

Recurrent Cast

Guest Cast

Guest Star Cast

Episodes

References 

Sociedade Independente de Comunicação original programming
2019 Portuguese television seasons